Shawinigan station is located on Chemin du CN in Shawinigan, Quebec, Canada. It is a former CN Rail station and is currently used by Via Rail for two routes running from Montreal. The station is staffed and is wheelchair-accessible. It is a designated Heritage Railway Station.

References

External links

Via Rail stations in Quebec
Canadian National Railway stations in Quebec
Transport in Shawinigan
Railway stations in Mauricie
Heritage sites in Mauricie